The Picture Exchange Communication System (PECS) is an augmentative and alternative communication system developed and produced by Pyramid Educational Consultants, Inc. PECS was developed in 1985 at the Delaware Autism Program by Andy Bondy, PhD, and Lori Frost, MS, CCC-SLP. The developers of PECS noticed that traditional communication techniques, including speech imitation, sign language, and picture point systems, relied on the teacher to initiate social interactions and none focused on teaching students to initiate interactions. Based on these observations, Bondy and Frost created a functional means of communication for individuals with a variety of communication challenges. Although PECS was originally developed for young children with autism spectrum disorder (ASD), its use has become much more widespread. Through the years, PECS has been successfully implemented with individuals with varying diagnoses across the aged span. PECS is an evidence-based practice that has been highly successful with regard to the development of functional communication skills.

Philosophy

The training protocol is based on the principles of applied behavior analysis. The goal of PECS is spontaneous and functional communication. The PECS teaching protocol is based on B. F. Skinner's book, Verbal Behavior, such that functional verbal operants are systematically taught using prompting and reinforcement strategies that will lead to independent communication. Verbal prompts are not used, thus building immediate initiation and avoiding prompt dependency. PECS begins with teaching a student to exchange a picture of a desired item with a communicative partner, who immediately honors the request. After the student learns to spontaneously request for a desired item, the system goes on to teach discrimination among symbols and then how to construct a simple sentence. In the most advanced phases, individuals are taught to respond to questions and to comment. Additionally, descriptive language concepts such as size, shape, color, number, etc. are also taught so the student can make their message more specific. For example, I want big yellow ball.

PECS protocol

Reinforcer inventory: Prior to implementing the PECS protocol, it is highly recommended that the teacher, parent, or caregiver develops an inventory of items such as toys, books, and edibles that the learner enjoys. Preferred items are presented to the learner to determine which one(s) they want. This preference assessment is completed throughout the day in a variety of activities. Once the desired item or activity is determined, the communicative partner will entice the student with the item(s) by holding or showing the item. This way, no verbal prompting is needed. The chosen reinforcers should be assessed to ensure they are consistently motivating to the user.

The PECS Protocol occurs in six phases:

Phase 1 - how to communicate: During phase I, the focus is on teaching the student to initiate social communication by exchanging a picture of a desired item. This exchange is taught presenting one picture, selected by the trainer based on the student's observed preferences. Within Phase I, two trainers are utilized. One trainer acts as the student's communicative partner, and the other trainer acts as the physical prompter, who prompts the student after he makes an initiation towards the desired item. The student is taught to pick up the picture and reach towards the communicative partner with the picture, in exchange for the requested item.

Phase 2 - distance and persistence: During phase 2, the student is taught to expand the initiated social interaction by creating motivation for the student to seek out the communicative partner even when he or she is not nearby and waiting. The goal of this phase is to have the student generalize his or her requests across places and people and to increase the likeliness of spontaneous communication. The student is taught to communicate over longer distances whether it be across a table or going to another location to find a communicative partner, and initiate spontaneous communication. Training should progress across different settings, with different communicative partners, and different types of highly motivating and preferred items to assist in the generalization of PECS usage.

Phase 3 - discrimination between symbols: As soon as the student has demonstrated distance and persistence in multiple settings with multiple communicative partners, they are ready to be introduced to phase 3A - visual discrimination. During structured training sessions, the student will begin to work on discriminating between highly preferred and non-preferred items. During other times throughout the day, the learner should continue to generalize phase 2 skills. The next step is to teach discrimination between two items that are both contextually relevant and desirable to the learner. This is done with correspondence checks to ensure that the learner is requesting and taking the item for which he or she is asking. is taught discrimination of symbols and how to select the symbol which depicts a desired item. If students have difficulty with discrimination, there are systematic ways of incorporating error correction and alternative strategies. The ECS phase 3 App created by Pyramid Educational Consultants provides an easy way for teachers to practice picture discrimination with one or several learners within a single session.

Phase 4 - using phrases: Within phase 4, the student learns to construct simple sentences on a detachable sentence strip making requests such as "I want  ". The requests consist of a sentence starter, "I want", and a picture of the desired activity or item. The communicative partner reads back the sentence after it has been exchanged by the student. After the student has learned to construct the sentence and point to the pictures, a delay between "I want" and the picture of the desired item is inserted as a way to encourage vocalizations. Speech/vocalizations are celebrated by providing the student with a greater amount of the requested item/activity and additional preferred items as a way to promote speech on future exchanges. It is important to note that speech/vocalizations are never demanded, just encouraged through the use of the delay. Teaching PECS users to create a sentence using expressions such as "I want ___" is the first step in developing more complex sentence structures. After the student learns the basic sentence structure, descriptors such as color, shape, size, number are taught so that learner can make their preferences more specific, such as "I want 3 cars".

Phase 5 - answering a direct question: During phase 5, the student is taught to respond to the question, "What do you want?" The goal of this phase is for the learner to respond "I want ___ " after being asked some form of the "what do you want" question. This phase adds upon the already established skill of building a sentence while still using the desired item to motivate the user to respond. A delayed prompting procedure is used in which the question and gestural prompt are initially presented at the same time and later a delay is established between the question and gestural prompt. Ultimately, the student should answer the question before additional prompts are provided.

Phase 6 - commenting: The student can now make spontaneous requests and respond questions such as "What do you want?" by building the sentence "I want ___"  Within phase 6, the student is taught to respond to commenting questions as well as to spontaneously comment on items, people, or activities present in his or her environment. In this phase, the student is also taught the meaning of sentence starters to differentiate between appropriate responses to the questions "What do you see?", which results in a social outcome and "What do you want?" which results in a tangible outcome The teacher should structure the environment to give the student plenty of opportunities to have a variety of communication opportunities that encompass all of their communication skills.

Depending on the age and cognitive level of the user, the time to master PECS will vary. One study found that it takes an average of 246 trials for users to master all six phases of PECS.

Effectiveness
There is evidence that PECS is easily learned by most students, with its primary benefit being a means of communication for children and adults who have limited or no speech due to autism or other communication disorders. With regard to the intervention setting for AAC training, there is evidence that PECS is most readily learned when instruction takes place in a general education setting. Evidence also indicated that learners initiate a higher number of picture exchanges when PECS is taught in a single setting versus multiple settings. Research also advocates for the use of PECS training by non-professional implementers such as camp workers, counselors, or volunteers in their respective naturalistic settings, to better communication outcomes for those with complex communication needs.

The consensus among most researchers is that "PECS is recommended as an evidence-based intervention for enhancing functional communication skills of individuals with ASD." On the other hand, the 2009 National Standards Report from the National Autism Center lists PECs among emerging treatments that do not have sufficient evidence of effectiveness.

An initial concern was that PECS might delay or inhibit speech development. However, a recent review of several peer-reviewed studies found that "there is no evidence within the reviewed studies to suggest that PECS inhibited speech; to the contrary, if any effect was observed, it was facilitative rather than inhibitory." When difficulties do arise, it is often due to a lack of powerful reinforcers and/or trainer error. A systematic review of interventions for children with autism spectrum disorder reported that use of PECS resulted in short-term improvement in word acquisition, but the effects were not maintained over time.

Evidence from meta-analyses indicate that PECS does not result in equal communicative outcomes for all children with ASD. PECS training appears to have the most beneficial effects for younger learners. Research also relays that the use of PECS as a communication intervention may yield more effectiveness in children that have challenges with sustaining joint attention. In addition, evidence of maintenance and generalization effects of functional communication gains achieved through PECs training has been mixed. Research indicates that "PECS is probably best used as an initial intervention to teach manding and the basic elements of what is a communicative exchange," and is not the best selection "for a long-term intervention as it does not address question asking and may be better implemented as part of a multimodal system for when picture communications are more socially appropriate."

Additional applications
There is emerging research that suggests adults with developmental disabilities and severe communication deficits may benefit from the implementation of PECS. Others tried to combine PECS training with video modeling. Research conducted by David F Cihalk Et al. combined the use of PECS and video modeling to increase independent communicative initiations in preschoolers with autism and developmental delays. The founding of the study indicated that the use of video modeling facilitated student’s ability to become proficient in using PECS.

See also
Blissymbols

References

Bibliography 
Bondy, A.S. 2001. "PECS: Potential benefits and risks." The Behavior Analyst Today 2:127-132.
Mirenda, P. 2001. "Autism, Augmentative Communication, and Assistive Technology: What Do We Really Know?" Focus on Autism and Other Developmental Disabilities 16(3):141-151.
Hart, S., and Banda, D.R. 2010. "Picture Exchange Communication System With Individuals With Developmental Disabilities: A Meta-Analysis of Single Subject Studies." Remedial and Special Education. 31(6) 476–488.
Vicker, B. 2011. "What is the "Picture Exchange Communication System" or PECS?" Autism Support Network. Retrieved from: http://www.autismsupportnetwork.com/resources/autism-what-picture-exchange-communication-system-or-pecs-223321

External links
What is PECS? from the Official PECS USA website

Treatment of autism
Augmentative and alternative communication
Assistive technology

de:Bliss-Symbol